Zanclites is an extinct genus of prehistoric ray-finned fish.

Classification
Zanclites is a member of the tselfatiiformes, a group of fish typical of the Cretaceous period and usually endowed with large dorsal fins. In particular, Zanclites would appear to have been a member of the Plethodidae family . Zancltes xenurus was first described by Jordan in 1924 , based on a well-preserved fossil from the Niobrara formation in Kansas ( United States ). Other fish belonging to the same family found in the same formation are Niobrara and Pentanogmius .

References

Late Cretaceous bony fish
Prehistoric ray-finned fish genera
Tselfatiiformes
Late Cretaceous fish of North America